Singaporeans participate in a wide variety of sports for recreation as well as for competition. Popular sports include football, swimming, track and field, basketball, rugby union, badminton, table tennis, and cycling. Many public residential areas provide amenities like swimming pools, outdoor spaces (i.e. street football and basketball courts, running tracks) and indoor sport centres, with facilities for badminton, table tennis, squash among others.

As an island city-state, Singapore is surrounded by waters thus, many Singaporeans also enjoy water sports like swimming, water polo, sailing, kayaking, rowing and waterskiing. There is also a number of avid recreational scuba divers, a prominent diving spot being the southern island of Pulau Hantu, famous for its coral reefs.

Although Singapore does not have a de jure national sport, football is arguably the most popular spectator sport in Singapore. Singapore has its own professional football league, known as the Singapore Premier League (formerly known as S. League). Launched in 1996, it consists of nine teams competing against one another, with one based in Brunei, as of 2023. Since 2019, all eight teams in Singapore shared their home stadiums with one other team, which are mostly located in heartland towns. In 1998, 2004, 2007 and 2012, the Singapore national football team were champions in the AFF Championship, the premier football competition in Southeast Asia.

Singapore athletes have performed well in both regional and international competitions, mainly in swimming, badminton, table tennis, bowling, sailing, water polo, sepak takraw, and silat. To date, Singapore has won a total of one gold, two silver and two bronze Olympic medals. Singapore has also amassed a total of 41 gold, 59 silver and 117 bronze medals at the Asian Games.

Recreational
The most popular sports in Singapore include outdoor sports like football, swimming, track and field, rugby union and cycling as well as various indoor sports like badminton, table tennis and basketball. 

Most Singaporeans live in public residential areas with amenities like swimming pools, outdoor spaces (i.e. street football and basketball courts, running tracks) and indoor sport centres, with facilities for badminton, table tennis, squash among others.

As an island city-state, Singapore is surrounded by waters thus, water sports like swimming, water polo, sailing, kayaking, rowing and waterskiing are also popular among Singaporeans.

Domestic competition
Singapore has its own football league, the Singapore Premier League (formerly known as S. League), formed in 1996, which comprises nine clubs, including one based in Brunei. 

In 2003, Singapore hosted a round of the UIM F1H2O World Championship in Marina Bay. The event subsequently took the title of Singapore Grand Prix. 

In 2006, the Singapore Slingers joined the National Basketball League in Australia but, left in 2008. The Singapore Slingers were one of the inaugural teams in the ASEAN Basketball League founded in October 2009. 

Beginning in 2008, Singapore started hosting a round of the Formula One World Championship. The race was staged at the Marina Bay Street Circuit in the Marina Bay area, and became the first night race on the F1 calendar, and the first street circuit in Asia.

Government-sanctioned programmes
The Government of Singapore sanctions a variety of sports-based programmes for education in addition to the normal physical education. The National Physical Fitness Award (NAPFA) was introduced in 1982, a scheme which requires mandatory participation of all students within primary and secondary education. The scheme gives awards for a variety of physical tests for endurance, cardiovascular fitness and strength, including a medium-distance run of 1.6 or 2.4 kilometres for primary and secondary students respectively, and the results are reflected in each student's report book. As such, although gaining an award is not mandatory, students are often pressured to do so.

In addition, the government sponsors the Singapore Sports School, which was established on 2 April 2004, combining a secondary school curriculum with professional training in each student's preferred sport, in an attempt to nurture future generations of sportsmen and sportswomen. The concept behind the Singapore Sports School is that sporting talent should not be compromised when striving for academic excellence.

Youth Olympic Games

On 21 February 2008 the International Olympic Committee announced that Singapore won the bid to host the inaugural 2010 Summer Youth Olympics. Singapore beat Moscow in the final by 53 votes to 44. On 15 September 2010, Senior Parliamentary Secretary for Ministry of Community Development, Youth and Sports Teo Ser Luck announced that Singapore will start off the Singapore Biennale Games initiative to keep up the Singapore Youth Olympic Games 2010 Legacy, to be held every 2 years, starting from year 2011.

Singapore has also performed well in subsequent editions of the Youth Olympic Games. To date, the country has won a total of 2 gold, 3 silver and 4 bronze medals {cn}. Singapore sent its first 3 winter sport athletes to the 2020 Winter Youth Olympics held in Lausanne, Switzerland.

Rugby union

Rugby was first introduced in Singapore during the late 19th century, when Singapore was still a Crown colony part of the British Empire. It has had a steady presence since the beginning of the 20th century, when the Malay Cup between the Singapore national team and the Malayan national team was established, which was one of the oldest rugby competitions in the world.

List of achievements

Badminton
Wong Peng Soon
1950, 1951, 1952, 1955, All-England Champion, Men's singles
Ong Poh Lim
1954, All-England Champion, Men's doubles
Li Li
2002, Gold, Commonwealth Games in Manchester, Women's singles
Ronald Susilo
2004, Gold, 2004 Japan Open, Men's singles
Loh Kean Yew
2021, Champion, BWF World Championships in Spain, Men's singles
Terry Hee
2022, Gold, Commonwealth Games in Birmingham, Mixed doubles
Tan Wei Han
2022, Gold, Commonwealth Games in Birmingham, Mixed doubles

Basketball
Singapore national basketball team
South East Asian Games
1979-Bronze Medal
2013-Bronze Medal
2015-Bronze Medal
ASEAN Basketball Championship
2001-Bronze Medal
2013-Bronze Medal
Singapore Slingers
In 2006, they were the first and only Asian team that was ever given permission to play in Australia's NBL. They finished the 2006–07 NBL season with a 13–20 record.
ASEAN Basketball League
2016-Final Runner Up
2018-Final Runner Up
2019-Final Runner Up

Bodybuilding
Joan Liew Lee Ting
 2011, 1st place, NPC Tournament of Champions held in USA
 2010, 2nd place, NPC Tournament of Champions held in USA
 2009, 1st place, Multi Asian Championships (over 52 kg)
 2006, 1st place, Asian Women's Open Invitational Championships in Singapore (Welterweight)
 2006, Guest posing at Singapore Bodybuilding Championships in Singapore
 2002, Gold, Asian Women's bodybuilding Championships in China
 2001, Guest posing at Singapore Bodybuilding Championships in Singapore
 2001, 7th place, 6th World Games in Japan (over 52 kg)
 2000, Gold, Asian Bodybuilding Championships
Abdul Halim bin Haron
 2000, Bronze, Asian Championship, welterweight (75 kg)
 2002, Gold, Asian Games in Busan, bantamweight (65 kg)
Azman bin Abdullah
1993, Gold, IOC-sanctioned World Games Bodybuilding Championships, middleweight
1993, Gold, World Bodybuilding Championships, middleweight
 3-time Mr Asia
Simon Chua
 2002, Gold, Asian Games in Busan, welterweight (75 kg)
 2002, Gold, Commonwealth Bodybuilding Championships in Calcutta, welterweight (75 kg)
 2003, Bronze, commonwealth bodybuilding champs

Bowling
 Adelene Wee Chin Suan
1985, won 3 Golds at Asian FIQ Youth Championships, in Singles, Masters, and Team
1985, won Ladies Masters champion, World FIQ Championship in London
Jesmine Ho
2001, Masters Champion, World Bowling Masters Championship in Abu Dhabi
Jennifer Tan
2002, Masters Champion, World Bowling Masters Championship in Denmark
Remy Ong
2002, won 3 Golds, Asian Games in Busan, Single, Trios, and Masters

Chess
 Ignatius Leong
 Lian Ann Tan

Cricket

Cuesports
 Peter Gilchrist
1994, WPBSA World Champion
2001, WPBSA World Champion
2009, Gold Medalist, English Billiards (Singles), SEA Games
World Record for highest billiard break at 1346

Football

Singapore Lions
Malaysia Cup
24 times Champion
Singapore national football team
ASEAN Football Championship
1998-Champions
2004-Champions
2007-Champions
2012-Champions
 Fandi Ahmad
1983–1985, Played for FC Groningen. Scored in a shock 2–0 against Inter Milan. In 1999, was voted one of the best 25 players ever to play for FC Groningen, earning him a place in the club's Hall of Fame. In 2003, he was named in the club's best eleven of the twentieth century.
1988, Golden Boot Award, Malaysia Cup
V. Sundramoorthy
 Played at FC Basel for Switzerland
Adam Swandi
Played at French division 3 team FC Metz
Safuwan Baharudin
Played at Australia top division team Melbourne City

Netball
In 2005, the Singaporean team won the Asian Netball Championship with a win over the Malaysian team with a score of 53–39 at the Finals.

Pétanque
Cheng Zhi Min
2015, Bronze, Malaysia Port Dickson Open Triples in Port Dickson, Malaysia
2015, Bronze, 2nd South-East Asia Petanque Association (SEAPA) Championship Phnom Penh, Cambodia
Goh Wee Teck
2015, Bronze, Malaysia Port Dickson Open Triples in Port Dickson, Malaysia
2015, Bronze, 2nd South-East Asia Petanque Association (SEAPA) Championship Phnom Penh, Cambodia
Shanti Prakash Upadhayay
2015, Bronze, Malaysia Port Dickson Open Triples in Port Dickson, Malaysia
2015, Bronze, 2nd South-East Asia Petanque Association (SEAPA) Championship Phnom Penh, Cambodia

Sailing
Benedict Tan
1994, Gold, Asian Games in Hiroshima, Laser class
1989, 1991, 1993, 1995, Won Laser Gold in SEA games
Joan Huang and Naomi Tan
1998, Gold, Asian Games, Ladies International 420 Class
Siew Shaw Her and Colin Ng
1998, Gold, Asian Games, Men's International 420 Class
 Teo Wee Chin and Terence Koh
 2005, Gold, Youth Sailing World Championship, Busan, 420 class
Sarah Tan and Lim Tze Ting
2008, Gold, Asian Games, Women's International 420 Class

Silat
Sheik Alauddin
1990, Gold, World Silat Championships in the Netherlands, 80–85 kg
1994, Gold, World Silat Championships in Thailand, Men's Open
Muhammad Shakir Bin Juanda
2012, World Pencak Silat Championships in the Class-I (85–90 kg) category
2016, World Pencak Silat Championships in the Class-I (85–90 kg) category
Sheik Farhan
2015, World Pencak Silat Championships in the Class-J (90–95 kg) category
2016, World Pencak Silat Championships in the Class-J (90–95 kg) category

Squash
Pang Ka Hoe, Benedict Chan, Samuel Kang and Vivian Rhamanan
2017, Gold, South East Asia Games, men's team
Pamela Chua, Au Yeong Wai Yhann, Mao Shi Hui and Sneha Sivakumar
2017, Silver, South East Asia Games, women's team

Swimming
Ang Peng Siong
1982, Gold, US swimming Championships, 50 m freestyle, with 22.69 s, fastest time in 1982
1982, Gold, Asian Games in New Delhi, 100 m freestyle
1990, Silver, Asian Games, 50 m freestyle
Neo Chwee Kok
1951, won 4 Golds, Asian Games in New Delhi, 1500 m, 400 m, 800 m freestyle, 4 × 100 m relay
Junie Sng Poh Leng
1978, won 2 Golds, Asian Games, 400 m freestyle, 800 m freestyle, breaking Asian Games record in both events
Joscelin Yeo
1993, won 9 Golds, 1 Silver, Southeast Asia Games
1994, won 1 Bronze, Asian Games, 100 m fly
1995, won 7 Golds, 2 Silvers, Southeast Asia Games
1997, won 3 Golds, 1 Silver, 2 Bronzes, Southeast Asia Games
1999, won 6 Golds, 2 Silvers, 1 Bronze, Southeast Asia Games
2000, member of world-record setting and NCAA Championships, 200 m medley relay, with teammates from University of California
2001, won 3 Golds, 4 Silvers, Southeast Asia Games,
2002, won 1 Bronze, Asian Games in Busan, 100 m fly
2003, won 4 Golds, 1 Silver, Southeast Asia Games,
Thum Ping Tjin
Swam across the English Channel in August 2005.
Tao Li
2005, won 3 Golds and 1 Bronze, 23rd Southeast Asian Games
2006, won 1 Gold and 1 Bronze at the 2006 Asian Games, another 1 Gold and 1 Bronze at Milo Asia Swimming Championships
2007, won 4 Golds, 24th Southeast Asian Games
2008, made it into the finals for the 100m butterfly event at the 2008 Summer Olympics in Beijing, set two Asian records and the national record in the process, became the eighth fastest butterfly swimmer in the world and the first Singaporean swimmer to enter an Olympic final.
Joseph Schooling
2016, won Gold for the 100m butterfly event at the 2016 Summer Olympics in Rio de Janeiro

Table tennis
Li Jiawei
2001, Won 4 Golds, Commonwealth Championships in New Delhi
 Woman's Singles,
 Woman's Double, with Jing Junhong
 mixed doubles, with Duan Yongjun
 Women's Team Champion
2002, Won 3 Golds, Commonwealth Championships,
 Woman's Double, with Jing Junhong
 mixed doubles, with Duan Yongjun
 Women's Team Champion
2003, Won US Open
2004, Won US Open
Jing Junhong
2001, Win 2 Golds, Commonwealth Championships, New Delhi
 Woman's Double, with Li Jiawei
 Women's Team Champion
2002, Won 2 Golds, Commonwealth Championships,
 woman's Double, with Li Jiawei
 Women's Team Champion
Duan Yongjun
2001, Gold, Commonwealth Championships, mixed doubles, with Li Jiawei
2002, Gold, Commonwealth Championships, mixed doubles, with Li Jiawei
Feng Tianwei
Wang Yuegu
Yu Mengyu

Taekwondo 

 Ng Ming Wei
 2017, Gold, Commonwealth Championships (Men's -58 kg)
 2015, Bronze, Southeast Asian Games (Men's -54 kg)

Track and field
Chee Swee Lee
1974, Gold, Asian Games, 400 m
Ng Liang Chiang
1951, Gold, Asian Games in New Delhi, 110 m hurdles

Weight lifting
Chua Phung Kim
1962, Gold, Commonwealth Games, bantamweight
1970, Silver, Commonwealth Games, bantamweight
Tan Howe Liang
1958, Gold, Asian Games in Tokyo
1958, Gold, commonwealth Games, lightweight
1960, Silver, Summer Olympic Games in Rome, lightweight
1962, Gold, commonwealth Games, middleweight

Wushu
Vincent Ng
1995, Gold, World Wushu Championships in Baltimore, United States

See also 
Sports in colonial times in Singapore
National sport records in Singapore
Foreign Sports Talent Scheme
Culture of Singapore
OCBC Cycle Singapore

References

External links
 Supercar Motorsports Dream Drive Website
 Singapore Sports Council official website
 List of National Sports Associations in Singapore
 Team Singapore
 
 Sports-related listings in Singapore
 Singaporesports.sg – One-stop sports events and news site